Kerala Gazetted Officers' Federation is an organization of government employees in Kerala, India. It is politically connected to the Communist Party of India.

The present General Secretary is Dr. V. M. Harris and the State President is Sri. K. S. SAJIKUMAR.

Trade unions in India
Trade unions in Kerala
Public sector trade unions
Year of establishment missing